Bernardus Jozua Karel (Bernard Joshua Charles of B.J.K.) Cramer (Delft, 4 March 1890 - 1978) was a Dutch architect.

Life and work 
He worked in the Dutch East Indies from 1918 until approximately 1923 in Batavia, Dutch East Indies as part of the Civil Service Public Works (Batavia bij de Dienst Burgerlijke). He returned to the Netherlands in 1923 and founded his own 
architectural firm.

The renovation of the Weversend was one of his first projects in the Netherlands.

Jan Kruisheer (1925-2000), known for his hospital architecture, worked for Cramer beginning in 1954 and took over the firm after Cramer's retirement in 1959.

Works
Pasar Glodok, Pancoran-Jalan Pintu Besar Utara (Pantjoran-Binnen Nieuwpoortstraat), Batavia (now Jakarta) (1920)
Pasar Gambir
Missigit, Batavia
Renovation of Weversend
Gemeentelijk slacht- en koelhuis
Engineers School at the William Buytewechstraat 45 by architects BJK Cramer and C. Elffers (1949)

Gallery

See also
Colonial architecture of Indonesia
List of Indonesian architects

References

1890 births
1978 deaths
Dutch architects
People from Batavia, Dutch East Indies